Stephen John Hunter (born 28 October 1968) is a New Zealand actor and voice over artist, currently based in Sydney, Australia. He played the Dwarf Bombur in The Hobbit film series.

Filmography

Films

Television

References

External links
 
 https://www.stephen-hunter.com/
 https://marqueemgt.com.au/talent/actors/stephen-hunter
 https://www.emvoices.com.au/artists/stephen-hunter/

1968 births
21st-century New Zealand male actors
Living people
New Zealand male stage actors
New Zealand male television actors